Charley Toorop (24 March 18915 November 1955) was a Dutch painter and lithographer. Her full name was Annie Caroline Pontifex Fernhout-Toorop.

Life
Charley Toorop was born in Katwijk. She was the daughter of Jan Toorop and Annie Hall. She married the philosopher Henk Fernhout in May 1912, but they divorced in 1917. Her son Edgar Fernhout (1912–1974)  also became a painter. Her other son,  (1913–1987), became a filmmaker, and often worked together with Joris Ivens. As a filmmaker he sometimes used the name John Ferno. Charley's daughter in law was the well-known Jewish photographer Eva Besnyö (1910–2003), who married John in 1933.

In the on-line biography of the Dutch poet Hendrik Marsman on the website of the  Charley Toorop is mentioned as one of the women who had a relationship with Marsman before he married in 1929 his wife Rien Barendregt.

Work

Charley Toorop became a member of the group of artists called Het Signaal (The Signal) in 1916. The group aimed at depicting a deep sense of reality through the use of colours and heavily accentuated lines and through fierce contrasts of colours. This is one of the reasons why Toorop is seen as adherent to the Bergense School.

Toorop befriended other artists, among them Bart van der Leck and Piet Mondriaan. In 1926 Charley Toorop went to live for two years in Amsterdam, where her painting became influenced by film. Frontally depicted figures stand isolated from each other, as if lit by lamps at a movie set. Her still lifes show kinship to the synthetic cubism of Juan Gris. From the 1930s onwards, she painted many female figures, as well as nudes and self-portraits in a powerful, realistic style. Well-known is her large painting Three Generations (Drie generaties) (1941–1950; in the Museum Boijmans Van Beuningen, Rotterdam), which is a self-portrait, a portrait of her father and of her son Edgar, in which she unites both realism and a sense of symbolism.

Her ruthless realism has a magic touch. "Is the natural appearance reality," she wondered in 1917, "or can we sense in its form only the most unreal that appears before us? This unreal, which is the most real."

Toorop had lived at many different places, but from 1932 on she resided in Bergen, North Holland, a town she'd previously had her home between 1912-1915 and 1922–1926. There she designed and commissioned a house called "De Vlerken", situated at the Buerweg 19. The house is still there, although after a fire its thatched roof has been replaced by a tiled roof. Charley Toorop died in Bergen on November 5, 1955. Her works are in many public collections, notably in the Kröller-Müller Museum in Otterlo.

Literature
 Rembert, Virginia Pitts (2005) "Charley Toorop" in: Woman's Art Journal, 26, no. 2, (2005): 26–32.
 Bremer, Jaap B.J. (1995) "Charley Toorop : works in the Kröller-Müller Museum collection", Otterlo : Kröller-Müller Museum. , .

Exhibitions (selection)
 November 11, 2008 – April 5, 2009: "Werken op papier" - Charley Toorop (1891–1955) (prints), Museum Kranenburgh, Bergen, North Holland
 September 27, 2008 – February 1, 2009: the Museum Boijmans Van Beuningen in Rotterdam showed her work in the exhibition "Vooral geen principes!".
 September 4, 2004 – March 13, 2005: an exhibition of her work was held at the Groninger Museum in Groningen.
 January 12, 1982 - April 12, 1982: retrospective exhibition of Charley Toorop in Centraal Museum in Utrecht.

Public collections
Museum Boijmans van Beuningen in Rotterdam
 in Bergen, North Holland
Kröller-Müller Museum in Otterlo
Stedelijk Museum Alkmaar in Alkmaar
Groninger Museum in Groningen
 Museum de Fundatie, Zwolle, The Netherlands

Notes and references

External links
 Self portrait with palette, Kunstmuseum The Hague
 Toorop on Artcyclopedia.com
 biographical notes of Charley Toorop, in Dutch RKD-Archive, The Hague
 some pictures of her paintings: on the website of Museum of Modern Realism

1891 births
1955 deaths
20th-century Dutch women artists
20th-century Dutch painters
Dutch women painters
Dutch people of British descent 
Modern painters
People from Katwijk
People from Bergen, North Holland
Dutch lithographers
Women lithographers
20th-century lithographers